The Vivantes Hospital Group is a state-owned healthcare company operating hospitals, primary health care centers, nursing facilities and other medical centers in Berlin. The company runs 10 hospitals with total capacity of about 6,000 beds and more than 17,000 employees.

Structure 
The Vivantes Hospital Group was founded in 2001. The hospital group includes 10 hospitals with around 100 medical departments and institutions, rehabilitation centers, 40 centers of excellence, primary healthcare facilities, 12 nursing facilities and other outpatient and inpatient healthcare facilities in Berlin. The hospital group has a capacity of about 6,000 beds and more than 17,000 employees, 2,300 of which are physicians. According to the company, it is the biggest state-owned hospital group in Berlin providing hospital care for about a third of patients in the city seeking inpatient care.

The hospitals in the group are:
 Vivantes Humboldt-Klinikum
 Vivantes Klinikum Spandau
 Vivantes Klinikum Am Urban
 Vivantes Auguste-Viktoria-Klinikum
 Vivantes Wenckebach-Klinikum
 Vivantes Klinikum Neukölln
 Vivantes Klinikum Kaulsdorf
 Vivantes Klinikum im Friedrichshain
 Klinikum Prenzlauer Berg
 Vivantes Ida-Wolff-Krankenhaus

It runs an international department, Vivantes International Medicine, to coordinate the medical tourism, for which Berlin is one of the popular destinations.

The state of Berlin undertook a bank guarantee for 180 million euros in 2011 to finance development projects. The company made a profit each year from 2004 to 2011.

References

Medical and health organisations based in Berlin
Hospitals in Germany
Health care companies of Germany
Organizations disestablished in 1887